The 1951 Texas Western Miners football team was an American football team that represented Texas Western College (now known as University of Texas at El Paso) as a member of the Border Conference during the 1951 college football season. In its second season under head coach Mike Brumbelow, the team compiled a 3–7 record (2–4 against Border Conference opponents), finished fifth in the conference, and were outscored by a total of 241 to 152.

Schedule

References

Texas Western
UTEP Miners football seasons
Texas Western Miners football